Sir Nicholas Anthony Joseph Ghislain Mostyn KC (born 13 July 1957 in Lagos, Nigeria), styled The Hon. Mr Justice Mostyn, is a British High Court judge, assigned to the Family Division.

Early life
The son of a British American Tobacco executive from North Wales, Mostyn was born in Nigeria, and grew up there and in Venezuela and El Salvador. After his parents divorced, he was educated at Ampleforth College alongside Edward Stourton where they won the Observer Mace debating prize. He then studied law at the University of Bristol.

Career
With pupillage at Middle Temple, he was called to the bar in 1980, and initially undertook County Court domestic violence cases. He took silk in 1997. In 2000/1 he was on the losing side of the husband farmer in the White v White case, where the judge ruled that "there should be no bias in favour of the money-earner and against the home-maker and the child-carer."

After this his career took off, and after winning a number of notable cases including representing the wife of footballer Ray Parlour, and winning the 1,000 day marriage case for the wife of a leading City of London fund manager where no children where involved, he earned himself the nickname of "Mr Payout." At the height of his earnings, he is said to have received £500 an hour. He was retained by Fiona Shackleton in Paul McCartney's divorce case with Heather Mills. Mostyn would also undertake pro bono cases where he thought there was an important issue of law involved, particularly issues arising from the functions of the Child Support Agency:

Mostyn became an assistant recorder in 1997, and both a recorder and a deputy High Court judge (in the Family Division) in 2000. Mostyn was appointed a full-time High Court judge on 20 April 2010, on the retirement of Mr Justice Bennett. He was knighted on 11 May 2010.

In 2015, Mostyn was removed from the second case that year, after he went against a landmark ruling of the Supreme Court concerning the rights of disabled people (namely that they have the same right to “physical liberty” as non-disabled people).

Notable Cases
Karen v. Ray Parlour: won more than £4m in 2004 in a divorce against the settlement former Arsenal F.C. footballer, where it was ruled that Karen's efforts to curb Parlour's addiction to the 'laddish' footballer drinking culture meant she had played an important role in his career. She was awarded a £250,000 lump sum, an annual personal maintenance allowance of £406,500, two tax-free homes, £37,000 maintenance for their three children, and 37.5% of his future earnings.
Miller v  Miller: City of London fund manager Alan, who was married to Melissa for less than 1000 days, was ordered to pay her £5m of his reported £65m fortune. No children were involved.
Sandra v. Sir Martin Sorrell: won the ex-wife of the CEO of advertising group WPP, a 40:60 share of marital in 2005, a sum of £29m after being "marginalised and dehumanised" by her husband during their 32-year marriage. The payout included a £23.4m lump sum, £2m in bank deposits, the family's £3.25m home, and two parking spaces valued at £200,000.
Shan v. Harry Lambert: in 2001, won £7.5M for the ex-wife of the newspaper proprietor. Harry Lambert who was represented by Martin Pointer QC. In 2002 after an appeal by Harry, the figure was increased by £2.6m, half Lambert's £20m fortune. Lambert described his ex-wife's contribution to their 23-year marriage as "revolving around children and the microwave," the judge quoted White v White back to him.
Zeta v. Francois Graff: won the model, socialite and actress £10m on divorcing diamond heir Francois in 2003. The settlement included a London property and a jewellery collection, from a family worth more than £100m. Mostyn described the settlement as a "crushing victory."
 Sir Paul McCartney v. Heather Mills: in which Mostyn was retained by McCartney's solicitor Fiona Shackleton, before Mills' solicitor Anthony Julius, leading to them being known during the case by the media as the "legal dream team."
Charles Spencer, 9th Earl Spencer v. second wife, Carolyn Freud: Mostyn represented the Earl. After losing the right to have the case heard in a closed court session, the Earl was upset at the final settlement. Mostyn, a keen farmer, named his latest batch of seven pigs after his thoughts on the case's high court judge, Mr Justice James Munby: James, Munby, Self-regarding, Pompous, Publicity, Seeking, Pillock. The Earl later unsuccessfully sued Mostyn.
Katrin Radmacher v Nicolas Granatino:Mostyn represented Nicolas Granatino against millionairess, Katrin Radmacher. Mrs Radmacher was represented by Richard Todd QC. Mrs Radmacher was successful in effecting a change in the common law so that pre-nups were no longer void for public policy reasons.
 Re AA: Mostyn presided as judge and authorised an NHS Trust to deliver a deliver a child by emergency caesarian section, as the mother was judged to have lacked capacity to have consented to the operation herself.  The mother was an Italian citizen who was visiting the UK; during her visit she suffered a severe psychological episode. The child was later the subject of a care application by Essex County Council.
 RF v Secretary of State for Work And Pensions [2017] EWHC 3375 (Admin) (21 December 2017): Mostyn ruled that the DWP had been engaging in practices that were "blatantly discriminatory against those with mental health impairments and which cannot be objectively justified. The wish to save nearly £1 billion a year at the expense of those with mental health impairments is not a reasonable foundation for passing this measure." Ministers had earlier rewritten the law in order to be able to ignore the outcome of a tribunal that resulted in similar conclusions. The DWP decided not to appeal after Justice Mostyn's ruling.

Mostyn labels himself "Catholic, Welsh and Wagnerian", enjoys smoking, hunting, windsurfing and skiing; and follows ("generally despairingly") Southampton F.C. and the England cricket team.

References

1957 births
Living people
Alumni of the University of Bristol
British people of Welsh descent
Welsh King's Counsel
Family Division judges
Knights Bachelor
People educated at Ampleforth College
Residents of Lagos
Welsh barristers
Welsh Roman Catholics
Nigerian people of British descent
Nigerian emigrants to the United Kingdom